Bochum-Riemke station is a railway station in the municipality of Bochum, North Rhine-Westphalia, Germany. The station has two side platforms, and is served by 80 Glückauf-Bahn regional trains per day (half of that on weekends). In addition, many freight trains run on the route, especially at night. It was originally named Bochum-Graetz, then Bochum-Nokia from 1993 to 2009.

Rail services

References

Riemke